The 1900 United States presidential election in Montana took place on November 6, 1900 as part of the 1900 United States presidential election. Voters chose three representatives, or electors to the Electoral College, who voted for president and vice president.

Montana overwhelmingly voted for the Democratic nominee, former U.S. Representative and 1896 Democratic presidential nominee William Jennings Bryan, over the Republican nominee, President William McKinley. Bryan won Montana by a landslide margin of 18.64% in this rematch of the 1896 presidential election. The return of economic prosperity and recent victory in the Spanish–American War helped McKinley more than double his votes from the previous election, but he still lost decisively.

Bryan had previously defeated McKinley in the state four years earlier but would later lose the state to William Howard Taft in 1908.

To date, Bryan's two wins in the state are the only times a Democrat has carried Montana without winning the presidency.

Results

Results by county

See also
 United States presidential elections in Montana

References

Montana
1900
1900 Montana elections